The 1987 Tipperary Senior Hurling Championship was the 97th staging of the Tipperary Senior Hurling Championship since its establishment by the Tipperary County Board in 1887. The championship began on 27 September 1987 and ended on 1 November 1987.

Borris-Ileigh were the defending champions, however, they failed to qualify after being defeated by Lorrha in the North Tipperary Championship.

On 1 November 1987, Cappawhite won the championship after a 1-17 to 2-13 defeat of Loughmore-Castleiney in the final at Semple Stadium. It remains their only championship title.

Qualification

Results

Quarter-finals

Semi-finals

Final

Championship statistics

Top scorers

Top scorers overall

Top scorers in a single game

References

External link

 1987 County final programme

Tipperary
Tipperary Senior Hurling Championship